The Absaroka Mountain Lodge is a historic dude ranch located between Cody, Wyoming and Yellowstone National Park in the Absaroka Mountains.  The property in Shoshone National Forest was known as the Gunbarrel Lodge when it was established about 1917 by Earl F. Crouch. It received its enduring name in 1925, and was progressively expanded until the 1970s.

References

External links

Absaroka Mountain Lodge at the Wyoming State Historic Preservation Office

Buildings and structures in Park County, Wyoming
Dude ranches in Wyoming
Historic districts on the National Register of Historic Places in Wyoming
Ranches on the National Register of Historic Places in Wyoming
Rustic architecture in Wyoming
National Register of Historic Places in Park County, Wyoming